John Barrie Smythe (born August 31, 1989) is a Canadian field hockey player who plays as a defender or midfielder for the Vancouver Hawks and the Canadian national team.

His older brother Iain Smythe also is a Canadian international field hockey player.

International career
Smythe represented Canada at the 2018 World Cup, where he played all four games. In June 2019, he was selected in the Canada squad for the 2019 Pan American Games. They won the silver medal as they lost 5–2 to Argentina in the final.

In June 2021, Smythe was named to Canada's 2020 Summer Olympics team.

References

External links

1989 births
Living people
Field hockey players from Vancouver
Canadian male field hockey players
Male field hockey midfielders
Male field hockey defenders
Field hockey players at the 2018 Commonwealth Games
2018 Men's Hockey World Cup players
Field hockey players at the 2019 Pan American Games
Pan American Games silver medalists for Canada
Pan American Games medalists in field hockey
Medalists at the 2019 Pan American Games
Commonwealth Games competitors for Canada
Field hockey players at the 2020 Summer Olympics
Olympic field hockey players of Canada
20th-century Canadian people
21st-century Canadian people